Elsa the lioness ( 28 January 195624 January 1961) was a female lion raised along with her sisters "Big One" and "Lustica" by game warden George Adamson and his wife Joy Adamson after they were orphaned at only a few days old. Though her two sisters eventually went to the Netherlands' Rotterdam Zoo, Elsa was trained by the Adamsons to survive on her own, and was eventually released into the wild.

Her story is told in several books by the Adamsons, as well as the 1966 motion picture Born Free.

Life 
Elsa and her sisters were orphaned on 1 February 1956 after George Adamson was forced to kill their mother when she charged him, in defence of her three cubs. George only later realised why the lioness had acted so aggressively towards him. George and his wife Joy then adopted the lioness’s four-day-old cubs.

While Elsa lived in many ways like a domesticated pet when she was small, Joy Adamson, whom Elsa trusted the most, considered her relationship with Elsa to be that of equals. Indeed, after sending the other two to a zoo, Joy was fiercely determined to give Elsa the education she needed to hunt and live in the wild. Her efforts paid off, earning Elsa worldwide fame at the time, when her early life’s story was published in the book Born Free. When Elsa was three years old, she brought three cubs of her own to show to the Adamsons, whom the Adamsons named "Jespah" (male), "Gopa" (male), and "Little Elsa" (female). The life of Elsa and her cubs is covered in the book Living Free, published not long afterwards.

Elsa died prematurely of a form of babesiosis, a tick-borne blood disease similar to malaria which often infects the cat family. Elsa’s grave is in the Meru National Park. She died as local sentiment had begun to turn against Elsa and her cubs, forcing the Adamsons to consider moving them. Elsa’s death made her cubs much more averse to human contact, even with the Adamsons themselves, complicating what would be their eventual capture and release in the Serengeti. The fate of the cubs upon their release was uncertain, though George Adamson was able to find Little Elsa, healthy and in the company of two other unrelated lions, during 19 months of subsequent searching. This was the last time that the Adamsons saw any of Elsa's cubs.

Books 
 Born Free 1960Written by Joy Adamson; Library of Congress Catalog Card No. 60-6792
 Living Free 1961Written by Joy Adamson; Library of Congress Catalog Card No. 61-15810
 Forever Free 1962Written by Joy Adamson; Library of Congress Catalog Card No. 63-8081
 Bwana Game (UK Title) 1968, A Lifetime With Lions (USA Title) 1970Written by George Adamson
 My Pride and Joy 1986Written by George AdamsonISNS 978-0-00-272518-7 0 00 272518 5.

Films 
 Elsa the Lioness (1961), 29 minutes; BBC documentary produced, hosted and narrated by David Attenborough. Filmed just before Elsa's death, it follows Joy and George Adamson as they search for Elsa (who has been wounded in a fight with another lioness) and her three cubs. It shows remarkable footage of Meru National Park and its wildlife. Joy Adamson recounts the visit of Attenborough and his cameraman Geoff Mulligan in her book Living Free. 
 Born Free (1966), 95 minutes; starring Bill Travers and Virginia McKennaGeorge Adamson was the technical advisor. Directed by James Hill. Academy Award winner and Golden Globe Award winner.
Living Free (1972), starring Susan Hampshire and Nigel Davenport, based not on the book by the same name, but on the third book of the series, Forever Free.
Elsa and Her Cubs, 25 minutes; Extremely rare film footage of Elsa and her cubs Jespah, Gopa, and Little Elsa. It includes Joy and George Adamson. Although the film begins by saying the narrator is George Adamson, it is not George Adamson speaking.
Elsa's Legacy: The Born Free Story (2010), 53 minutes; Documentary marking the 50th anniversary of Joy Adamson's book Born Free. It includes home footage of Elsa and her cubs shot by the Adamsons and interviews with Virginia McKenna and David Attenborough.

Television 
 Born Free (1974), television series based on the film, starring Gary Collins and Diana Muldaur.
 Elsa - The Lioness that Changed the World (2011) - documentary narrated by Richard Armitage.

See also
 Christian the lion

References

External links 
A tribute to Elsa  This site contains a huge amount of information and listings of the books, films, many photos and even letters written by both Joy and George Adamson.
Born Free Foundation
Wildlife Artist Gary Hodgesdrawing of Elsa by Gary Hodges in memory of Bill Travers.
Elsa the Lioness (1961) Original Documentary

Individual lions
Lions and humans
Environment of Kenya
1956 animal births
1961 animal deaths
Samburu National Reserve